Schijen is the name of several mountain summits in Switzerland:

 Schijen (Glarus Alps)
 Schijen (Schwyzer Alps)